Yong Rui is the chief technology officer and senior vice president of Lenovo Group. He is in charge of Lenovo's technical strategy, research and development directions, and Lenovo Research, one of Lenovo's most important innovation engines.

Education 
Rui received his bachelor's degree from Southeast University, master's Degree from Tsinghua University, and PhD from University of Illinois at Urbana-Champaign (UIUC).

Career 
Before taking office as Lenovo CTO and SVP in November 2016, Rui had worked at Microsoft for 18 years. He started out as researcher and senior researcher of the Multimedia Collaboration group at Microsoft Research, Redmond, US (1999–2006). He then worked as director of Strategy (2006–2008), director of Microsoft Education Product in China (2008–2010), GM of Microsoft Asia-Pacific R&D (ARD) Group (2010–2012) and senior director and deputy managing director of Microsoft Research Asia (MSRA) (2012–2016).

Research 
Rui's areas of research include multimedia analysis, understanding, and retrieval, and artificial intelligence.

He has shipped numerous technologies and products at both Lenovo and Microsoft, including Lenovo LiCO, Lenovo ThinkCloud, Lenovo MOLI, Lenovo daystAR, Microsoft Bing Search (image search, video search and entity search), Microsoft XiaoIce, Microsoft Satori (entity graph), Microsoft Office (RoundTable, OneNote and Sway), Microsoft OneDrive (photo tagging), Microsoft Hololens (3D reconstruction), and Microsoft Cognitive Services on Azure (face, image and video analysis).

Awards & Publications 
Rui is a Fellow of the ACM, IEEE, IAPR, SPIE, a foreign member of Academia Europaea, and an International Fellow of the Canadian Academy of Engineering.

Rui won the 2018 ACM SIGMM Award for Outstanding Technical Contributions to Multimedia Computing, Communications and Applications and the 2017 ACM TOMM Nicolas D. Georganas Best Paper Award.

In 2016, Rui received the IEEE Computer Society Edward J. McCluskey Technical Achievement Award "for pioneering contributions to multimedia analysis and retrieval" and the IEEE Signal Processing Society Best Paper Award.

In 2010, he was honored with the Most Cited Paper of the Decade Award from the Journal of Visual Communication and Image Representation.

Rui holds 67 US and international issued patents and is a prolific author. He has published 4 books, 12 book chapters, and 260 referred journal and conference papers.

Professional activities 
Rui serves as the editor-in-chief of IEEE MultiMedia magazine, an associate editor of ACM Trans. on Multimedia Computing, Communication and Applications (TOMM), and is a founding editor of the International Journal of Multimedia Information Retrieval (IJMIR).

In addition, Rui was an executive member of ACM SIGMM and the founding chair of its China Chapter.

Rui was also a member of review panels for the US National Science Foundation (NSF), the National Natural Science Foundation of China (NSFC), the Australian Research Council, and the Research Grants Council of Hong Kong.

References 

Living people
Chinese business executives
Southeast University alumni
Tsinghua University alumni
University of Illinois Urbana-Champaign alumni
Chinese computer scientists
Fellows of the Association for Computing Machinery
Year of birth missing (living people)